Donny Carr Lambeth (born 1950) is a  Republican member of the North Carolina House of Representatives. He has represented the 75th district (including constituents in eastern Forsyth County) since 2013.

Political positions
Lambeth voted for the 2017 budget that did not provide teachers with a stipend for out-of-pocket expenses. Over half of teachers in North Carolina have second jobs. NC has improved its rank from 41st in 2017 to 29th in the country for teacher pay and 2nd in the SouthEast two years later.

Committee assignments

2021-2022 session
Appropriations (Senior Chair)
Appropriations - Health and Human Services (Vice Chair)
Health (Chair)
Education - K-12
Education - Universities
Insurance
Pensions and Retirement
UNC BOG Nominations

2019-2020 session
Appropriations (Senior Chair)
Appropriations - Health and Human Services (Vice Chair)
Health (Chair)
Education - K-12
Education - Universities
Pensions and Retirement
Families, Children, and Aging Policy

2017-2018 session
Appropriations (Chair)
Health (Chair)
Health Care Reform (Chair)
Education - K-12
Education - Universities
Insurance
Pensions and Retirement
State Personnel
Aging

2015-2016 session
Appropriations (Chair)
Health (Chair)
Education - K-12
Insurance
State Personnel
Aging

2013-2014 session
Appropriations
Education
State Personnel
Agriculture
Banking
Commerce and Job Development

Electoral history

2020

2018

2016

2014

2012

References

Living people
1965 births
People from Winston-Salem, North Carolina
High Point University alumni
Wake Forest University alumni
21st-century American politicians
Republican Party members of the North Carolina House of Representatives